The 2007–08 season was Paris Saint-Germain's 38th season in existence. PSG played their home league games at the Parc des Princes in Paris, registering an average attendance of 36,755 spectators per match. Alain Cayzac presided the club until April 2008, when Simon Tahar replaced him. The team was coached by Guy Lacombe until January 2007, when Paul Le Guen took over as manager. Pauleta was the team captain.

News
Sylvain Armand extended his contract with Paris Saint Germain until 2011. The divorce between Paul Le Guen and Fabrice Pancrate was definitive. The player refused to participate during the pre-season and the LFP suspended his contract with PSG. Jérôme Rothen signed an extension to his deal with Paris Saint Germain and was now tied to the Parc des Princes until 2011. PSG officially launched www.psg.tv, their very own web TV channel, only available over the internet. PSG.TV broadcasts exclusive content including: interviews with players, re-runs of classic matches, exclusive reports, press conferences, training sessions at the Camp des Loges and footage showing snippets of life inside the club. Francis Borelli, historic president of Paris Saint-Germain, died following a long illness. Two minutes of silence were observed at the Parc des Princes before a match against Rennes in his memory. PSG fans displayed a giant banner dedicated to President Francis Borelli: "25 years later it is Le Parc who bows before you President". The banner referred to a memorable scene during the 1982 French Cup Final between PSG and Saint-Étienne. Francis Borelli rushed to the field and kissed the lawn of the Parc des Princes after Dominique Rocheteau scored an extra-time equalizer a few seconds before the final whistle to force a penalty shootout. Jean-Marc Pilorget transformed the match-winning penalty and gave PSG their first major trophy. Jérôme Rothen was named "Player of the Month" for September by the UNFP with 60% of the votes.

Mamadou Sakho became PSG's youngest ever captain after wearing the armband on his league debut − aged 17 − against Valenciennes. Paris Saint-Germain fans clashed with police before the game at Auxerre. The fans had been waiting for the bus carrying the PSG players, which used another entrance. Paris Saint-Germain recorded their first victory away to Auxerre since 1999. Following their loss to Toulouse at the Parc des Princes during Week 18, PSG recorded their worst start to a season at home in their history and for the first time the club from the capital finished the first half of the league campaign without a single victory as hosts. Paris Saint-Germain recorded their first victory away to Saint-Étienne since 1994. PSG launched www.leparcdesprinces.fr, the official website of the Parc des Princes. "Welcome to the Parc des Princes website ! To know all about this French monument, its history, its plans, and its news (sports, culture and promotional events) go into the pages of its official website, entirely devoted to the Paris stadium". Walter Butler, head of Butler Capital Partners, sold most of its shares to Colony Capital, which now owned 68% of the Parisian club. The group led by Sébastien Bazin in France became the majority shareholder of Paris Saint-Germain. Loris Arnaud signed a new two-year contract extension until June 2010. Guyanese singer Henri Salvador died in Paris aged 90. Supporter of Paris Saint-Germain since the early 1970s, Henri Salvador had four lifetime subscriptions at the Parc des Princes since the Hechter era. The club was in a bad financial situation and Daniel Hechter asked his friends to get their hands in their pockets. Hechter offered a lifetime subscription at Le Parc for all matches of PSG in exchange for 10,000 francs in donations. Henri Salvador took four. According to a survey made by magazine France Football, the Parc des Princes was the favorite stadium of Ligue 1 players. Paris Saint-Germain fans decided to protest against the club's poor form by boycotting the first 15 minutes of every home match since December to show their discontent.

Alain Cayzac, president of Paris Saint Germain, resigned from his position after his team was thrashed by Caen, dropping deeper into relegation zone. PSG were going through their worst ever crisis with relegation to the second division looming. With four league games remaining PSG sat 18th out of 20, just above already-relegated Metz and three points behind fourth from bottom Lens. Several PSG players' cars were attacked by irate supporters, some of whom spray-painted threats on walls at the club's training ground at Saint-Germain-en-Laye. The club hired Michel Moulin as director of sport to work alongside Le Guen. Simon Tahar was appointed president of Paris Saint-Germain. Reading "Paedophiles, unemployed and inbred: Welcome to the Sticks", the banner was displayed at the League Cup Final, of which French President Nicolas Sarkozy was in attendance. As well as disbanding the "Boulogne Boys" - who are considered one of the oldest hooligan groups in France - an inquiry into finding and punishing those responsible was launched. Lens mayor Guy Delcourt wanted the match to be replayed after the racist banner incident. The match was not replayed, but PSG were fined and banned from the following edition. The measure was later overturned on appeal. Pauleta said goodbye to the Parc des Princes after PSG's last home match of the season against Saint-Étienne. PSG fans unfurled a giant banner dedicated to Pauleta: "Your name and our colors forever linked". Following their victory away to Sochaux, Paris Saint-Germain avoided relegation in the last match of the season and ensured their continuity in the top-flight. Pauleta, Portugal and PSG's all-time leading goalscorer, announced his retirement at the end of the season. The Portuguese striker, surnamed "The Eagle of Azores", scored 110 goals for Paris Saint-Germain. Pauleta was honored for his career achievements. Mayor of Paris Bertrand Delanoë awarded Pauleta the Great Vermeil Medal of the City of Paris during a press conference at the Hôtel de Ville de Paris. President Simon Tahar and sports councillor Michel Moulin resigned.

Transfers
In

Total spending:  €9 million

Out

Total income:  €0 million

Squad information

Kits 

Dubai-based airline Fly Emirates was the shirt sponsor. American sportswear brand Nike was the kit manufacturer.

Board & Staff

Friendly tournaments

Emirates Cup 

Each team plays two matches, with three points awarded for a win, one point for a draw, and a point for every goal scored.

Competitions

Ligue 1

Paris Saint-Germain and Sochaux shared the points in a close encounter in Paris as neither side forced a breakthrough. A goalless draw at the Stade Félix-Bollaert saw Lens and PSG win a point apiece in a game containing few clear cut chances. PSG slumped to their first defeat of the season, a campaign in which they were yet to win, as Lorient stunned a packed Parc des Princes crowd with a comeback win. Paris Saint-Germain picked up a point after a goalless draw with Metz at the Stade Saint-Symphorien. A Pierre-Alain Frau goal three minutes from time handed PSG a precious point at the Parc des Princes as the capital club came back from a goal down to record yet another draw against Lille. Sylvain Armand and Amara Diané secured PSG's first victory of the season away to Le Mans. PSG and Olympique de Marseille played out a draw at the Parc des Princes as Djibril Cissé and Péguy Luyindula netted early goals. A goal each from Sylvain Armand and Amara Diané prove enough for PSG as they beat Monaco at the Stade Louis II, a late Jérémy Ménez free-kick nothing but a consolation for Ricardo Gomes' men. PSG fell to their second defeat of the season with a reverse to Bordeaux, Johan Micoud and David Bellion scoring the goals for "Les Girondins". A goal and an assist from former playmaker Jérôme Leroy condemned PSG to a third league defeat of the season as Rennes continued their impressive start. High-flying Valenciennes missed a golden opportunity to take fourth spot in Ligue 1 after being held to a goalless draw by struggling Paris Saint-Germain at the Stade Nungesser. Lyon overcame a spirited PSG side in the capital to extend their lead at the top of the table, Sidney Govou's goal the clincher.

Two goals in the opening 20 minutes set Paris Saint-Germain on the way to three much-needed points at Strasbourg, a victory that lifted "Les Parisiens" well clear of the relegation zone. PSG were still waiting for their first home win of the season after they could only draw against high-flying visitors Nancy at the Parc des Princes. PSG lost away to Nice to relinquish the honour of being the last unbeaten team on the road in Ligue 1. The defeat saw Paul Le Guen's side slip into the relegation zone. A nightmare season continued in the French capital as a terrible defensive error from Ceará gifted Caen victory at the Parc des Princes and left PSG mired in the relegation zone after yet another shocking result. At blustery Auxerre, PSG recorded a fine win to move out of the bottom three, Péguy Luyindula heading home the game's only goal. Johan Elmander continued his fantastic scoring form with another two goals as Toulouse performed a textbook smash and grab at the Parc des Princes and took home all three points. A solitary Péguy Luyindula goal saw off Saint-Étienne, "Les Parisiens" surviving a first-half onslaught to steal all three points with a narrow victory. Amara Diané scored twice for PSG to record the club's first league home win of the season and leave Lens empty-handed in a one-sided encounter at the Parc des Princes. Grégory Bourillon's first-half own goal brought an end to PSG's resurgent run of form as Lorient claimed a deserved victory over Paul Le Guen's capital outfit at the Stade du Moustoir. PSG moved up to 12th in the Ligue 1 table with an emphatic win over relegation candidates Metz at the Parc des Princes. Lille and Paris Saint-Germain played out a goalless draw, a result that did little to ease both sides' relegation fears.

Paris Saint-Germain and Le Mans shoot blanks in a tactical encounter at the Parc des Princes. Mamadou Niang was the hero for Marseille as the Senegal striker hit the winner in a victory over bitter rivals PSG at the Stade Vélodrome. A late error from Paris-Saint-German goalkeeper Mickaël Landreau gifted visitors Monaco a point at the Parc des Princes. A Wendel hat-trick blasted PSG away as Bordeaux hanged on to the heels of Lyon at the top of Ligue 1. Jimmy Briand inspired Rennes to a victory over PSG to ease the pressure on the Brittany team. Pauleta's late equalizer against Valenciennes kept PSG out of the relegation zone after yet another game in which good chances were spurned by Paul Le Guen's ailing side. Alain Perrin's Lyon romped to a win over relegation candidates PSG with goals from Fred, Sidney Govou and Juninho. Many PSG fans suggested that catch-up Ligue 1 game against Strasbourg was just as important to their relegation-haunted team as the League Cup Final - and sub Amara Diané's goal gave them a precious win. Nancy maintained their season-long unbeaten home run with a win over PSG, a Marc-Antoine Fortuné goal sending the League Cup winners to another league defeat. PSG remained in great danger near the foot of Ligue 1 following a home defeat to Nice, Bakari Koné and Ederson winning the game for "Les Aiglons" in the last eight minutes. Paris Saint-Germain's nightmare season in Ligue 1 continued, with Paul Le Guen's ailing side looking prime candidates for relegation after a hapless defeat at Caen. Amara Diané scored two goals as PSG beat Auxerre and kept alive their hopes of avoiding relegation. Toulouse's Mohamed Fofana denied fellow relegation strugglers Paris Saint-Germain a vital three points with a late equalizer. Jérémy Clément notched his first Ligue 1 goal of the season as Paul Le Guen's side mounted a second-half fightback against in-form Saint-Étienne and climbed out of the bottom three with just one game to go. Two goals from Amara Diané preserved Paris Saint-Germain's Ligue 1 status after a nerve-jangling encounter at Sochaux.

League table

Results summary

Results by round

Coupe de France 

Ligue 1 strugglers Paris Saint-Germain kick-started the New Year on a winning note in the French Cup. PSG, who have won the French Cup on seven occasions, got first-half goals from Clément Chantôme and Sylvain Armand for their victory over fourth division Épinal. Paris Saint Germain ended the French Cup dreams of fifth division Le Poiré-sur-Vie. Striker Amara Diané netted twice as PSG shrug off poor form to reach last-16. Paris Saint-Germain reached the quarter-finals of the French Cup thanks to two-goal hero Loris Arnaud, who found the net twice in a win over Bastia. After their magnificent victory over Marseille in the previous round, minnows Carquefou, from the French fifth grade, had the chance of another mighty scalp in the quarter-final, where they faced PSG. Carquefou's French Cup dream finally ended when Pauleta earned PSG a narrow win over the amateur outfit in the eagerly-awaited quarter-final clash between the sides at the Stade de la Beaujoire. Yannick Boli scored 12 minutes from time to give Paul Le Guen's PSG a narrow win over Ligue 2 side Amiens in the semi-final to claim their place in the French Cup Final at the Stade de France. Sidney Govou's extra-time winner gave Ligue 1 champions Lyon a narrow victory over PSG. Paul Le Guen's capital side dominated for long periods but it was Alain Perrin's men who lifted the trophy.

Coupe de la Ligue

Paris Saint-Germain cruised past Lorient and reached the last-16 of the League Cup. Young starlet David N'Gog scored his first two goals for PSG, while Pauleta pounced late on to seal the victory. Paris Saint-Germain at last treated their supporters to a home win when they defeated second division Montpellier. PSG goalkeeper Mickaël Landreau saved a Grégory Lacombe penalty in the 77th minute. PSG avoided a potential giant-killing at the hands of Montpellier as Pauleta moved level with former stalwart Dominique Rocheteau. The Portuguese hitman became the club's joint-highest goalscorer with goals 99 and 100. PSG met Valenciennes in the next round who made history by qualifying to the League Cup quarter-finals for the first time in the club's history. Ten-man PSG reached the League Cup semi-finals after smashing Valenciennes at the Parc des Princes. The capital club made it two successive home wins in a row as Amara Diané struck twice to ensure VA cound not find a way past a spirited and free-scoring PSG side in their League Cup quarter final. PSG were drawn for home advantage in the League Cup semi-finals as they hosted Auxerre. Paris Saint-Germain booked a place in the League Cup Final with a win over Auxerre at the Parc des Princes. PSG qualified for their fourth League Cup final in 14 years and reached their 13th domestic final. Goals from Mario Yepes, Pauleta and Bernard Mendy ensured a place in the final after AJA could only manage a late Julien Quercia effort and a helping hand from PSG goalkeeper Mickaël Landreau. The capital side faced RC Lens at the Stade de France and looked forward to a first domestic cup final since 2006 when they beat bitter rivals Marseille in the French Cup Final. Pauleta scored the opening goal as PSG clinched a dramatic injury-time victory over Lens to become the only club to ever win the Coupe de la Ligue three times. Substitute Bernard Mendy struck the historic goal on a fabulous night of action when he rolled the ball home from the penalty spot in the 94th minute after Lens captain Hilton had hauled down substitute striker Péguy Luyindula in the box.

Start formations

Starting XI

Appearances and goals

Other statistics
{| class="sortable" border="2" cellpadding="4" cellspacing="0" style="text-align:left; margin: 1em 1em 1em 0; background: #f9f9f9; border: 1px #aaa solid; border-collapse: collapse; font-size: 95%;"
|-
!class="sortable" width="50px"|No.
!width="50px"|Pos.
!class="sortable" width="50px"|Nat.
!width="130px"|Player
!width="70px" style="background: #FFFFFF"| Assists
!width="70px" style="background: #FFFFFF"| Minutes Played
!width="50px" style="background: #FFEE99"|
!width="50px" style="background: #FFEE99"| 
!width="50px" style="background: #FF8888"|
|-
|1 || GK ||  ||  || 0 || 750 || 0 || 0 || 0
|----
|16 || GK ||  ||  || 0 || 0 || 0 || 0 || 0
|----
|30 || GK ||  ||  || 0 || 1440 || 0 || 0 || 0
|----
|2 || DF ||  ||  || 0 || 847 || 1 || 0 || 0
|----
|3 || DF ||  ||  || 0 || 1788 || 4 || 0 || 0
|----
|5 || DF ||  ||  || 1 || 1343 || 6 || 0 || 0
|----
|6 || DF ||  ||  || 0 || 1123 || 1 || 0 || 0
|----
|13 || DF ||  ||  || 0 || 0 || 0 || 0 || 0
|----
|22 || DF ||  ||  || 1 || 1573 || 3 || 0 || 0
|----
|26 || DF ||  ||  || 0 || 1936 || 2 || 0 || 0
|----
|4 || MF ||  ||  || 0 || 1436 || 3 || 0 || 0
|----
|10 || MF ||  ||  || 1 || 1036 || 1 || 0 || 0
|----
|12 || MF ||  ||  || 1 || 856 || 4 || 0 || 0
|----
|19 || MF ||  ||  || 2 || 1695 || 2 || 0 || 0
|----
|20 || MF ||  ||  || 0 || 1398 || 5 || 0 || 0
|----
|23 || MF ||  ||  || 0 || 869 || 3 || 0 || 1
|----
|24 || MF ||  ||  || 0 || 269 || 2 || 0 || 0
|-----
|31 || MF ||  ||  || 0 || 0 || 0 || 0 || 0
|----
|7 || FW ||  ||  || 4 || 1180 || 2 || 0 || 0
|----
|8 || FW ||  ||  || 1 || 1145 || 1 || 0 || 0
|----
|9 || FW ||  ||  || 2 || 1610 || 1 || 0 || 0
|----
|11 || FW ||  ||  || 1 || 2511 || 3 || 0 || 0
|----
|14 || FW ||  ||  || 0 || 50 || 1 || 0 || 0
|----
|21 || FW ||  ||  || 0 || 227 || 0 || 0 || 0

References

External links 

Official websites
 PSG.FR - Site officiel du Paris Saint-Germain
 Paris Saint-Germain - Ligue 1 
 Paris Saint-Germain - UEFA.com

Paris Saint-Germain F.C. seasons
Paris Saint-Germain